The 2013 MLS SuperDraft was the fourteenth SuperDraft presented by Major League Soccer. The draft took place on January 17, 2013 in Indianapolis, Indiana at the Indiana Convention Center.

The Colorado Rapids enjoyed returns from the 2013 draft, with its two first-round draft picks Dillon Powers and Deshorn Brown finishing first and second respectively in 2013 rookie of the year voting. The 2013 season also showed the ability of MLS teams to develop young talent without turning to the draft, as homegrown players DeAndre Yedlin and Gyasi Zardes finished third and fourth respectively in rookie of the year voting.

Selection order 
The official selection order was announced by Major League Soccer on December 6, 2012:

 The nine clubs which did not qualify for the playoffs received picks #1 through #9 (in reverse order of season points);
 The two clubs eliminated in the Knockout round of playoffs received picks #10 and #11 (in reverse order of season points);
 The four clubs eliminated in the Conference Semifinals received picks #12 through #15 (in reverse order of season points);
 The two clubs eliminated in the Conference Finals received picks #16 and #17 (in reverse order of season points);
 The club which lost 2012 MLS Cup received pick #18;
 The club which won 2012 MLS Cup received pick #19.

This selection order pertained to all rounds of the MLS SuperDraft. The same order was followed in the 2013 MLS Supplemental Draft held 5 days later.

Round 1 
Any player marked with a * is part of the Generation Adidas program.

Round 1 trades

Round 2 
Any player marked with an * is part of the Generation Adidas program.

Round 2 trades

Other SuperDraft trade notes 
 Portland Timbers acquired forward Mike Fucito from Montreal Impact in a trade on 20 April 2012. In return, Montreal was to receive either Portland's highest 2013 second-round SuperDraft pick or a 2013 international roster slot depending on Fucito's performance. Montreal received the international roster slot, not the draft pick.
 On 12 December 2012, Chivas USA acquired the #3 position in the MLS Allocation Order and either a second-round selection in the 2013 SuperDraft or a 2013 international roster slot from Portland Timbers in exchange for the #2 position in the MLS Allocation Order. Chivas USA elected to receive the international roster slot, not the draft pick.

Notable undrafted players

Homegrown players

References 

Major League Soccer drafts
SuperDraft
MLS SuperDraft
2010s in Indianapolis
Soccer in Indiana
Sports in Indianapolis
Events in Indianapolis
MLS SuperDraft